The Royal New Zealand Yacht Squadron is a New Zealand yacht club, and the club behind New Zealand's America's Cup campaigns, under the guises of New Zealand Challenge and Team New Zealand.  It held the America's Cup from 1995 until 2003, becoming in 2000 the first non-American holder to successfully defend the trophy. After Team New Zealand's victory in the 2017 event, the Royal New Zealand Yacht Squadron are the current holders of the America's Cup. On March 21, 2021, they beat Circolo della Vela Sicilia's Luna Rossa Challenge to again win the 2021 America's Cup.

The club was established in 1871 in Auckland with the name of the "Auckland Yacht Club". Its name was changed to "Royal New Zealand Yacht Squadron" when it was granted royal patronage in 1902.

It is located in Westhaven Marina, Auckland, close to the Auckland Harbour Bridge facing on to the Waitemata Harbour and Hauraki Gulf.

The Royal New Zealand Yacht Squadron is one of the main members of the International Council of Yacht Clubs.

References

Bibliography

 
Royal yacht clubs
1871 establishments in New Zealand
America's Cup yacht clubs
Sailing in New Zealand
Sport in Auckland
Organisations based in New Zealand with royal patronage
Team New Zealand
Waitematā Harbour